In enzymology, a fumarate reductase (NADH) is an enzyme that catalyzes the chemical reaction

succinate + NAD+  fumarate + NADH + H+

Thus, the two substrates of this enzyme are succinate and NAD+, whereas its three products are fumarate, NADH, and H+.

This enzyme belongs to the family of oxidoreductases, specifically those acting on the CH-CH group of donor with NAD+ or NADP+ as acceptor.  The systematic name of this enzyme class is succinate:NAD+ oxidoreductase. Other names in common use include NADH-fumarate reductase, NADH-dependent fumarate reductase, and fumarate reductase (NADH).

References

 

EC 1.3.1
NADH-dependent enzymes
Enzymes of unknown structure